Celestial Entrance is the second studio album by the Norwegian power metal band Pagan's Mind.

According to the liner notes, Celestial Entrance was "inspired by some of the theories of Erich von Däniken, the search for extra-terrestrial intelligence, the mystic parallels of the four religions, and ideas launched by certain open-minded scientists throughout the world."

Track listing

Personnel

Pagan's Mind
 Nils K. Rue – lead vocals, art design, logo, layout, and graphics
 Jørn Viggo Lofstad – guitar
 Thorstein Aaby – guitar
 Steinar Krokmo – bass guitar
 Stian Kristoffersen – drums
 Ronny Tegner – keyboards

Production
 Recorded by Øyvind Eriksen and Per Sælør at Klyve Lydstudio, Skien, Norway in January–March 2002.
 Clean guitars on "Conception" recorded at Mediamaker Studio in January 2002.
 Vocals recorded at Images & Words Studio, Skien, Norway in March 2002.
 Vocal transfer by Espen Mjøen at Mediamaker Studio, Skien, Norway.
 Transfer and editing by Kjetil Nesheim at NLC Studios in April 2002.
 Edited by Patrik J. and Fredrik Nordström.
 Mixed by Fredrik Nordström at Studio Fredman, Gothenburg, Sweden in April 2002.
 Mastered by Morten Lund at Masterhuset, Oslo, Norway in April 2002.

2002 albums
Pagan's Mind albums
Limb Music albums
Albums produced by Fredrik Nordström